Trinetrudu is a 1988 Indian Telugu-language film starring Chiranjeevi, Kaikala Satyanarayana, Ranganath and Nagendra Babu. It is based on the Hindi movie Jalwa (1987), and was directed by A. Kodandarami Reddy and produced by Chiranjeevi himself and his brother Nagendra Babu. The film was Chiranjeevi's 100th movie. The film is a remake of the 1984 film Beverly Hills Cop. It was dubbed in Hindi as Aaj Ka Shahenshah in 1997.

Plot 

Goa's beach is being exploited by a big-wig in the society, named D.D. (Kulbhushan Kharbanda). He runs a big ashram on Goa's beach, and under this Aashram's mask, he runs his underworld. His underworld is the channel for drug-trafficking, which cashes in upon the weakness of the youth. To investigate  this Aashram's dark secrets, the Indian government appoints a CBI officer (Nagendra Babu), who prepares a complete report on its activities, but is killed by D.D's men. When the CBI officer never returns, the CBI gets suspicious and sends another officer, who is Abhimanyu (Chiranjeevi). Abhimanyu lands in Goa and meets D.I.G. (Kaikala Satyanarayana) to inform him about his mission. But Goa police and CBI don't share good terms, and the D.I.G. appoints 2 Sub-Inspectors, (Nuthan Prasad and Prasad Babu) to follow and observe Abhimanyu. Meanwhile, Bhanupriya's brother becomes a drug addict, and to cure him, she gets him admitted into a hospital. Hospital chief Ranganath meets Abhimanyu in a strange incident. When Bhanu's brother tries to jump off the top floor of the hospital, Abhimanyu saves him and thus meets Bhanu. Being clueless about the missing CBI officer, Abhimanyu manages to enter into the ashram and exposes the secret activities carried out there. He witnesses drugs being exported in dead bodies. When Abhimanyu informs about these to D.I.G, he doesn't believe him, but under pressure, he raids the ashram, but finds nothing, much to the shock of Abhimanyu. D.D. becomes more self-conscious and Goa police stop co-operating with Abhimanyu. Abhimanyu is attacked in many ways, and the Goa police get rid of him by sending him off in a ship. However, Abhimanyu escapes and returns to Goa, this time more determined to complete his mission. Abhimanyu realizes that Ranganath is D.D.'s right hand, and he sets a trap in which Ranganath is killed by D.D. himself. He also succeeds in donating D.D.'s money to a homeless people's fund. D.D. gets furious, and kidnaps Chiru's mother (Annapurna). Abhimanyu informs this to the Goa police, but they don't believe him. So, Abhimanyu himself, as a one-man army, attacks the ashram, destroys it, rescues his mother and marries Bhanupriya.

Cast
Chiranjeevi
Bhanupriya
Kaikala Satyanarayana
Ranganath
Nagendra Babu
Babu Antony

Soundtrack

References

External links 
 

1988 films
Films directed by A. Kodandarami Reddy
1980s Telugu-language films
Indian remakes of American films
Indian action thriller films
Police detective films
Films set in Goa
Films shot in Goa
1988 action thriller films
Films scored by Raj–Koti